Olesya may refer to:

 Olesya (given name)
 Olesya (novel), an 1898 novelette by Alexander Kuprin
 Olesya (film), a 1971 drama film

See also
 Oles (disambiguation)